The Æðarstein Lighthouse is located on the southeast coast of Iceland, on a rocky point on the west side of the port of Djúpivogur.

Description 
The lighthouse consists of a square concrete tower, painted orange. A red metal lantern house is placed on top of the tower. The lighthouse is automated. The site (but not the tower) is open to visitors.

History 
The Æðarstein Lighthouse was built in 1922. The architect and engineers were architect engineer Thorvald Krabbe and Gudmundur J. Hlíðdal. Before 1966 the lighthouse was white with two horizontal stripes. The light was converted to electric power in 1987.

Characteristic 
The light flashes every 5 seconds. The flash is a white, green or red sector light.

See also 

 List of lighthouses in Iceland

References

External links 
 

Lighthouses completed in 1922
Lighthouses in Iceland
Buildings and structures in Eastern Region (Iceland)